Fylde North was a constituency which returned one Member of Parliament (MP) to the House of Commons of the Parliament of the United Kingdom from 1950, until it was abolished for the 1983 general election.

Boundaries 
The constituency was established in 1950, with the split of the Fylde constituency.  It covered the borough of Fleetwood, the urban districts of Poulton-le-Fylde, Preesall and Thornton Cleveleys and the Garstang Rural District.  It was largely replaced by the new Fylde constituency, although Garstang was added to Lancaster instead.

Members of Parliament

Elections

Elections in the 1950s

Elections in the 1960s

Elections in the 1970s

References 

UK General Election results May 1979, Political Science Resources

Parliamentary constituencies in North West England (historic)
Constituencies of the Parliament of the United Kingdom established in 1950
Constituencies of the Parliament of the United Kingdom established in 1983
Borough of Wyre